Ballycastle Railway was a  narrow gauge railway line which ran from Ballycastle to Ballymoney, both in County Antrim, Northern Ireland.

History

Ballycastle Railway opened in October 1880 and ran  from Ballymoney, on the Belfast and Northern Counties Railway (BNCR), later Northern Counties Committee (NCC), main line to Derry, to Ballycastle.  It was never a very profitable enterprise and closed down for a period in 1924, until rescued by the NCC, which took it over completely.

Services mainly consisted of three return journeys each day, taking between 50 minutes and an hour. At the start there were three Black Hawthorn 0-6-0ST engines and two Kitson 4-4-2T engines arrived in 1908. Initially carriages were of the compartment type painted two shades of brown, until largely displaced by LMS-designed corridor carriages transferred from the Ballymena and Larne Railway in 1933. The Ballycastle Railway closed in July 1950.

Nationalisation and closure
Under the terms of the Transport Act 1947 the London, Midland and Scottish Railway, the NCC's parent company, was nationalised by the British Government on 1 January 1948. The NCC (and the Ballycastle Railway) was thus briefly owned by the British Transport Commission. This was only a temporary measure and in 1949 the NCC was transferred to the Ulster Transport Authority (UTA) – owned by the Government of Northern Ireland. The UTA soon embarked on a major programme of railway closures, notably including much of the Belfast and County Down Railway. The Ballycastle Railway was one of the casualties; the UTA closed the line to all services on 3 July 1950.

Route

Ballymoney railway station
Dervock railway station, 
Stranocum railway station, 
Gracehill railway station, opened 1 December 1890
Armoy railway station, 
Balleeny Siding, 
Capecastle railway station, opened 1 February 1882
Ballast Pit, 
Tow Viaduct, 
Ballycastle railway station,

See also
List of narrow-gauge railways in Ireland

Other narrow gauge railways in Ulster 
Ballymena, Cushendall and Red Bay Railway
Ballymena and Larne Railway
Castlederg and Victoria Bridge Tramway
Cavan and Leitrim Railway
Clogher Valley Railway
County Donegal Railways Joint Committee
Londonderry and Lough Swilly Railway

References

Further reading

Closed railways in Northern Ireland
Transport in County Antrim
Railway companies established in 1880
Railway companies disestablished in 1950
3 ft gauge railways in Ireland
Defunct railway companies of Ireland
1880 establishments in Ireland
Ballycastle, County Antrim
1950 disestablishments in Northern Ireland